Thermosphaeroma subequalum is a species of isopod in the family Sphaeromatidae.

The IUCN conservation status of Thermosphaeroma subequalum is "LR/lc", lower risk, least concern. The IUCN status was reviewed in 1996.

References

Sphaeromatidae
Articles created by Qbugbot
Crustaceans described in 1978